Marek Sikora (born December 29, 1986) is a Czech professional ice hockey player. He currently plays with Piráti Chomutov in the Czech Extraliga.

Sikora made his Czech Extraliga debut playing with Piráti Chomutov debut during the 2012–13 Czech Extraliga season.

References

External links

1986 births
Living people
Czech ice hockey centres
Piráti Chomutov players
People from Havířov
Sportspeople from the Moravian-Silesian Region
Sportovní Klub Kadaň players
HC ZUBR Přerov players
AZ Havířov players
HC RT Torax Poruba players
HC Havířov players